The following is a timeline of the history of the city of Poitiers, France.

Prior to 20th century

 1st C. CE – Roman baths built.
 2nd C. CE – Roman  built.
 2nd–3rd C. – Roman Catholic Archdiocese of Poitiers established.
 4th C. CE – Baptistère Saint-Jean and Église Saint-Hilaire le Grand (church) built.
 350-367 - Hilary of Poitiers first bishop of Poitiers.
 418 – Region of southwest Gaul ceded to Visigoths per treaty.
 507 – Battle of Vouillé fought near Poitiers; Franks win.
 552 – Holy Cross Abbey (Poitiers) founded.
 732 – 10 October: Battle of Tours fought near Poitiers; Frankish forces defeat Mohammedans.
 10th C. – Église Saint-Hilaire le Grand rebuilding begins.
 955 – .
 11th C. – Église Notre-Dame la Grande, Poitiers (church) rebuilt.
 1018 – Palace of Poitiers destroyed by fire.
 1096 – Saint-Jean de Montierneuf Abbey built.
 1099 – Church of Sainte-Radegonde (Poitiers) dedicated.
 1122-1204 - Eleanor of Aquitaine was born, lived and died in Poitiers.
 1162 – Poitiers Cathedral construction begins.
 1199 – "Communal rights" granted to Poitiers.
 1356 – 19 September: Battle of Poitiers fought during the Hundred Years' War; English forces defeat French.
 1373 - Bertrand du Guesclin in power.
 1431 – University of Poitiers founded.
 1432 - Charles VII of France proclaimed king.
 1569 – City (unsuccessfully) besieged by Gaspard II de Coligny during the French Wars of Religion.
 1570s – Des Roches literary salon established.
 1770 – Blossac Park created, an historic private garden.
 1778 –  (bridge) built over the Clain river.
 1790 – Poitiers becomes part of the Vienne souveraineté.
 1793 – Population: 18,284.
 1801 –  and  created.
 1817 – Société d'agriculture, belles-lettres et arts de Poitiers founded.
 1834 –  founded.
 1851
Courrier de la Vienne newspaper begins publication.
 Poitiers station opened.
 1863 – L'Echo du Poitou newspaper in publication.
 1875 –  (city hall) built.
 1895 – Horse-drawn  begins operating.
 1898 – Société de géographie de Poitiers founded.

20th century

 1906 - Population: 31,532.
 1911 – Population: 41,242.
 1921 – Poitiers FC (football club) formed.
 1922 – Bitard student group formed.
 1944 – June: Bombing by Allied forces during World War II.(fr)
 1958 – Regional  newspaper begins publication.
 1973 – Cantons 1, 2, 3, 4, and 5 created.
 1974 – Musée Sainte-Croix (museum) built.
 1977 –  becomes mayor.
 1982
 Cantons  and  created.
  formed.
 1984 – University's École nationale supérieure d'ingénieurs de Poitiers established.
 1987 – Futuroscope theme park opens near Poitiers.
 1989 – Stade de la Pépinière (stadium) opens.
 1990 – 1990 Tour de France bicycle race departs from Futuroscope.
 1999 – Agglomeration community  (regional government) created.

21st century

 2004
  begins operating.
  begins.
 2008
  opens.
 Alain Claeys becomes mayor.
  construction begins.(en)
 University's  begins.
 2013 – Population: 87,427 city; 138,923 agglomeration.
 2014 – March: Municipal election held.(fr)
 2015 – May: Socialist Party (France)  held in Poitiers.
 2016 – Poitiers becomes part of the Nouvelle-Aquitaine region.

See also
 
 
 List of bishops of Poitiers
 List of counts of Poitiers
 
  department

Other cities in the Nouvelle-Aquitaine region:
 Timeline of Bordeaux
 Timeline of Limoges
 Timeline of La Rochelle

References

This article incorporates information from the French Wikipedia.

Bibliography

External links

 
 Items related to Poitiers, various dates (via Europeana)
 Items related to Poitiers, various dates (via Digital Public Library of America)

Poitiers